Following is a list of topics related to life extension:



A
 ACE inhibitor
 Actuarial escape velocity
 Adenosine triphosphate (ATP)
 Advanced Cell Technology Corporation
 Aerobic exercise
 Age-adjusted life expectancy
 Ageless
 Age-Related Eye Disease Study
 Age-Related Macular Degeneration
 Aging
 Aging and memory
 Aging-associated diseases
 Aging brain
 Aging population
 Alcor Life Extension Foundation
 Alternative medicine
 American Aging Association
 American Academy of Anti-Aging Medicine (A4M)
 Amyloid
 Amyloid plaque
 Amyotrophic lateral sclerosis (ALS), e.g., Lou Gehrig's disease
 Antagonistic Pleiotropy
 Antioxidant
 Polyphenol antioxidant
 Antisense therapy
 Apoptosis
 Atherosclerosis
 ATP (adenosine triphosphate)
 Autoimmune disease

B
 Biodemography
 Biodemography of human longevity
 Bioethics
 Biological clock
 Biogerontology
 Biological immortality
 Biomarkers of aging
 Biotechnology
 Brain–computer interface

C
 Caloric restriction mimetic
 Caloric restriction
 CR Society International
 Cell replacement therapy
 Cholinergic
 Clone
 Cloning
 Human cloning
 Therapeutic cloning
 Club of Rome
 Cockayne's syndrome
 Cognitive enhancement
 Compensation law of mortality
 Complementary and alternative medicine
 Cross-link
 Cyborg
 Cynthia Kenyon
 Cryobiology
 Cryonics
 Cryopreservation
 Cryoprotectant

D
 Daily values
 de Grey, Dr. Aubrey
 De Grey Technology Review controversy
 Demopoulos M.D., Harry B.
 Dendrite
 DHT (dihydrotestosterone)
 Dietary supplement
 Dietary Supplement Health and Education Act of 1994
 Dihydrotestosterone (DHT)
 DNA (Deoxyribonucleic acid)
 Mitochondrial DNA
 DNA damage theory of aging
 DNA repair
 Dolly the sheep
 Dopaminergic
 Drexler, K. Eric

E
 Ending Aging, a 2007 book which describes Aubrey de Grey's biomedical proposal for defeating aging (i.e. SENS).
 Endocrine system
 Engineered negligible senescence
 Engines of creation
 Error catastrophe
 Eugenics
 Eugeroic
 Evolution of ageing
 Exercise
 Aerobic exercise
 Existential risk
 Extropy

F
 Fantastic Voyage: Live Long Enough to Live Forever
 Food and Drug Administration (FDA)
 Free radical
 Superoxide radical
 Hydroxyl radical
 Free-radical theory of aging
 Full Genome Sequencing
 Futures studies
 Futurology

G
 Gene therapy
 Pharmacological Gene Therapy
 Genetic code
 Genetic engineering
 Genetically modified organism
 Genetics of aging 
 Genomics
 Geriatrics
 Geron Corporation
 Gerontology
 Geroprotector
 Gobel, David
 Gompertz-Makeham law of mortality
 Grossman, Terry
 Growth hormone (GH)

H
 Harman, Denham
 Hayflick, Leonard
 Hayflick limit
 Health
 Healthy diet
 Healthy eating
 Heart Disease
 HeLa
 Hormesis
 Hormone replacement therapy
 Human cloning
 Human enhancement
 Human genetic engineering
 Human Genome Project
 Humanism
 Hypoxia

I
 Immortal DNA strand hypothesis
 Immortality
 Immortalist Society
 Indefinite lifespan
 Institute for Ethics and Emerging Technologies

J

K
 Kent, Saul
 Kenyon, Cynthia
 Kirkwood, Thomas
 Klotho gene
 Kübler-Ross model
 Kurzweil, Ray

L
 Lacks, Henrietta
 Life expectancy
 Life extension
 Life Extension: A Practical Scientific Approach
 Life Extension Advocacy Foundation
 Life Extension Foundation
 Life Extension Institute
 Limits to Growth
 Lipofuscin
 List of long-living organisms
 List of health and fitness magazines
 Longevity
 Longevity genes

M
 Malthusian Catastrophe
 Malthusian Growth Model
 Malthusianism
 Malthus, Thomas
 Maximum life span
 Medawar, Peter
 Megadose
 Megadosing
 Megavitamin therapy
 Methuselah Foundation
 Methuselah Mouse Prize
 Mind transfer (mind uploading)
 Mitohormesis
 Molecular engineering
 Molecular nanotechnology
 Monoamine oxidase (MAO)
 Morphological freedom
 Mortality rate

N
 Nanomedicine
 Nanotechnology
 National Institute on Aging
 Neurite
 Neurochemical
 Neurodegenerative disease
 Neuroendocrine theory of aging
 Neurofibrillary tangle
 Neurotrophic factor
 Neurovitrification
 Nootropic
 Norepinephrin (noradrenaline)
 NSAID
 Nutrient
 Nutrition
 Nutritional supplement

O
 Old age
 Organ transplant
 Orthomolecular medicine
 Overpopulation
 Oxidation (redox)
 Oxidative stress

P
 Paleolithic diet
 Parkinson's disease
 Patients' Bill of Rights
 Pauling, Linus
 Pearl, Raymond
 Pearson, Durk
 Pharmacological Gene Therapy
 Polyphenol antioxidant
 Population control
 Population growth
 Population momentum
 Posthuman
 Predictive medicine
 Pregnenolone
 Prescription drugs (prices in the US prices)
 Prevention Magazine
 Prevention
 Preventive medicine
 Printable organs
 Pro-aging trance
 Procreative beneficence
 Progeria
 Programmed cell death
 Apoptosis (Type I cell death)
 Autophagy (a.k.a. cytoplasmic, or Type II cell death))
 Programmed obsolescence
 Prostatitis
 Pro-oxidant

Q
 Quercetin

R
 Rath, Matthias
 Raw foodism
 Reactive oxygen species
 Reliability theory
 Reliability theory of aging
 Redox (oxidation)
 Reference Daily Intake
 Regeneration
 Regenerative medicine
 Rejuvenation
 Reliability theory of aging and longevity
 Reprogenetics
 Resveratrol
 Ristow, Michael
 RNA

S
 Safety
 Occupational safety and health
 SAGE KE
 Senescence
 Senility
 Senolytic
 SENS Foundation
 Shaw, Sandy
 Sierra Sciences
 Sleep deprivation
 Sports medicine
 Stem cell
 Stem cell treatments
 Stone, Irwin
 Strategies for engineered negligible senescence
 Superoxide dismutase (SOD)
 Superoxide

T
 Technological determinism
 Technological evolution
 Technological singularity
 Technology assessment
 Techno-progressivism
 Techno-utopianism
 Telomere
 Therapeutic cloning
 Theories of aging
 Antagonistic pleiotropy theory of aging
 Disposable soma theory of aging
 Free-radical theory
 Glycation theory of aging
 Inflammation theory of aging
 Neuroendocrine theory of aging
 Order to disorder theory of aging
 Rate of living theory
 Reliability theory of aging and longevity
 Somatic mutation theory of aging
 Thiel, Peter
 Timeline of senescence research
 Tissue engineering
 Transhumanism

U
 Unageing
 Uniform Determination of Death Act
 United States Senate Agriculture Subcommittee on Research, Nutrition, and General Legislation

V
 Vitamin
 Cryopreservation#Vitrification

W
 Walford M.D., Dr. Roy Lee
 Weismann, August
 Werner syndrome
 West, Dr. Michael D.
 Williams, George C.

X
 Xeroderma pigmentosum

Y

Z



 
Life extension-related topics